Murovani Kurylivtsi is an urban-type settlement in the southwestern part of Vinnytsia Oblast, Ukraine. It was formerly the administrative center of Murovani Kurylivtsi Raion, but is now administered within Mohyliv-Podilskyi Raion. Murovani Kurylivtsi is located on the banks of the Zhvan River, a left tributary of the Dniester River, in the historic region of Podolia. Population:

History

The village of Churylivtsi was first mentioned in 1453. It was a part of the Kingdom of Poland and belonged to various Polish noble families, since the 17th century to the family of Kossakowski. It was located in the Podolian Voivodeship of the Lesser Poland Province of the Polish Crown. In 1793, after the Second Partition of Poland, the whole area was transferred to the Russian Empire. In Russia, it was a part of Ushitsky Uyezd of Podolian Governorate. On January 31, 1923 the uyezds were abolished. The Ukrainian Soviet Socialist Republic was established, and Murovani Kurylivtsi became the administrative center of the newly established Murovani Kurylivtsi Raion, which was a part of Mohyliv-Podilskyi Okruha. In 1925, the governorate was abolished, and okruhas were directly subordinated to Ukrainian SSR. In 1930, okruhas were abolished as well, and on February 27, 1932 Vinnytsia Oblast was established. In 1991, the Soviet Union was abolished, and Murovani Kurylivtsi became a part of independent Ukraine.

Economy

Transportation
Murovani Kurylivtsi is built into a dense road network of Ukraine and is connected by road with Mohyliv-Podilskyi, Zhmerynka, Bar, Vendychany, and Nova Ushytsia.

There is regular bus traffic connecting Murovani Kurylivtsi with Vinnytsia and with Mohyliv-Podilskyi, as well as local bus traffic around the district.

Culture and recreation
There is a classicist palace was built in the 18th century and a landscape park around it.

References

Urban-type settlements in Mohyliv-Podilskyi Raion
Ushitsky Uyezd